XEZON-AM (La Voz de la Sierra de Zongolica – "The Voice of the Sierra de Zongolica") is an indigenous community radio station that broadcasts in Spanish and Nahuatl from Zongolica, Veracruz, Mexico. It is run by the Sistema de Radiodifusoras Culturales Indígenas (SRCI) of the National Institute of Indigenous Peoples (INPI).

The station had planned to move to FM in 2018, but the migration to this band has not been made as of 2022, nor has a new concession been applied for or issued.

External links
XEZON website

References

1991 establishments in Mexico
Daytime-only radio stations in Mexico
Indigenous radio stations in Mexico
Nahuatl-language radio stations
Radio stations established in 1991
Radio stations in Veracruz
Sistema de Radiodifusoras Culturales Indígenas
Spanish-language radio stations